The 2010–11 Premier Arena Soccer League season consisted of 6 divisions of 32 teams across the US. The Premier Arena Soccer League continues to serve as the developmental league to the PASL-Pro.

Standings
As of March 5, 2011

(Bold Division Winner)

Division playoffs
South Central Division Finals
Sun. Feb. 27: Vitesse Dallas 8, DFW Tornados 5

2010-11 PASL-Premier Finals
The finals were played at Las Vegas, Nevada, on March 4–5, 2011.

Preliminary Round: Fri. March 4, 2011

9:15 am - Evansville Crush 7, CF Revolucion Tijuana 6
9:15 am - WSA Rapids 7, Los Angeles Bolts 4
10:00 am - Las Vegas Knights 7, Chico Bigfoot 2
10:00 am - San Diego Fusion 2, ASC Warriors 2
10:45 am - Vitesse Dallas 6, CF Revolucion Tijuana 2 
10:45 am - South Natomas All Stars 7, Los Angeles Bolts 5 
11:30 am - Chico Bigfoot 4, Colorado Springs Blizzard 1
11:30 am - ASC Warriors 3, Cincinnati Kings Reserves 3
12:15 pm - Vitesse Dallas 9, Evansville Crush 6
12:15 pm - South Natomas All Stars 6, WSA Rapids 3
1:00 pm - Las Vegas Knights 8, Colorado Springs Blizzard 0  
1:00 pm - San Diego Fusion 6, Cincinnati Kings Reserves 4

Knockout Round

Fri. March 4, 2011 Elimination Round
Game 13 - 1:45 pm - Colorado Springs Blizzard 8, Evansville Crush 3 
Game 14 - 1:45 pm - Cincinnati Kings Reserves 6, WSA Rapids 3 
Game 15 - 2:30 pm - Chico Bigfoot 7, CF Revolucion Tijuana 1
Game 16 - 4:00 pm - ASC Warriors 4, Los Angeles Bolts 2

Sat. March 5, 2011 Quarterfinals
Game 17 - 9:00 am - Las Vegas Knights 3, Cincinnati Kings Reserves 2
Game 18 - 9:55 am - San Diego Fusion 3, Chico Bigfoot 2
Game 19 - 10:50 am - Vitesse Dallas 4, ASC Warriors 1
Game 20 - 11:45 am - South Natomas All Stars 3, Colorado Springs Blizzard 2

Semifinals
Game 21 - 1:30 pm - Las Vegas Knights 5, Vitesse Dallas 3
Game 22 - 2:25 pm - San Diego Fusion 6, South Natomas All Stars 5 (Shootout)

Finals
Game 23 - 4:15 pm - Las Vegas Knights 3, San Diego Fusion 0 (Forfeit)

References

Premier Arena Soccer League seasons
Premier Arena Soccer League
Premier Arena Soccer League